Benton Township is an inactive township in Osage County, in the U.S. state of Missouri.

Benton Township has the name of Senator Thomas Hart Benton.

References

Townships in Missouri
Townships in Osage County, Missouri
Jefferson City metropolitan area